Involucrin is a protein component of human skin and in humans is encoded by the IVL gene. In binding the protein loricrin, involucrin contributes to the formation of a cell envelope that protects corneocytes in the skin.

Gene 

This gene is mapped to 1q21, among calpactin I light chain, trichohyalin, profillaggrin, loricrin, and calcyclin.

Function 

Involucrin is a highly reactive, soluble, transglutaminase substrate protein present in keratinocytes of epidermis and other stratified squamous epithelia. It first appears in the cell cytosol, but ultimately becomes cross-linked to membrane proteins by transglutaminase thus helping in the formation of an insoluble envelope beneath the plasma membrane functioning as a glutamyl donor during assembly of the cornified envelope.

Involucrin is synthesised in the stratum spinosum and cross linked in the stratum granulosum by the transglutaminase enzyme that makes it highly stable. Thus it provides structural support to the cell, thereby allowing the cell to resist invasion by micro-organisms.

Apigenin, a plant-derived flavanoid that has significant promise as a skin cancer chemopreventive agent, has been found to regulate normal human keratinocyte differentiation by suppressing involucrin, and this is associated with reduced cell proliferation without apoptosis.

Clinical significance 
As one of the precursor proteins of the cornified cell envelope, involucrin is markedly increased in inflammatory skin diseases such as psoriasis

Lamellar ichthyosis involves a decrease in expression of involucrin. This decrease could contribute to the altered desquamation process seen in the disease, since the clinical improvement associated with retinoid treatment is accompanied by increased expression of involucrin.

Structure

Involucrin consists of a conserved N-terminal region of about 75 amino acid residues followed by two extremely variable length segments that contain glutamine-rich tandem repeats. The glutamine residues in the tandem repeats are the substrate for the transglutaminase in the cross-linking reaction. The total size of the protein varies from 285 residues (in dog) to 835 residues (in orangutan).

References

Further reading 

 
 
 
 
 
 
 
 
 
 
 
 
 
 
 
 
 
 
 

Protein domains